TechRax is a YouTube channel that focuses on making videos about the destruction of cell phones (particularly Apple iPhones, Samsung's Galaxy S, and Samsung's Note Series) and other technological devices. The channel was founded by Taras Maksimuk (born August 5, 1993) on September 20, 2009.

History
Maksimuk began the TechRax channel as a standard tech blog but switched over to tech destruction videos in 2012 after discovering a demand for them. Maksimuk used the advertising revenue to finance his college studies. The first destruction he did is "iPhone 5 Hammer Smash Drop Test -Episode #1-". The destruction of Apple products are the most popular on the channel.

Format
TechRax's videos generally follow the same format, and involve stress tests, drop tests and experiments involving the deliberate destruction or damage of technology, typically smartphones. Maksimuk has crushed an iPhone 5S under a train, boiled an iPhone 6 in Coca-Cola, performed a head-to-head comparison between an iPhone 6 and Samsung Galaxy S6 to see which survives longer when boiled in water, and destroyed an Apple Watch Edition with neodymium magnets. The watch cost $10,000, which he raised through advertising in other videos. The video drew over six million views by February 2016. He subsequently melted crayons and dipped an iPhone 6s into them which then resulted in a major fire.

Drop tests
A common video format on the channel involves drop tests of iPhones and other brands of phones, sometimes after encasing them in a substance to see if they would survive the fall. Other videos involve dropping objects from tall buildings.

References

YouTube channels launched in 2009
1993 births
Living people